KRWB (1410 AM) is a classic rock formatted radio station, licensed to Roseau, Minnesota, USA. It is owned and operated by Border Broadcasting, along with a sister station, KKWQ. They share studios at 113 Lake St NW, in Warroad. Their two tower transmitter site is on County Road 28, east of Roseau.

External links

RWB
Radio stations in Minnesota
Classic rock radio stations in the United States
Radio stations established in 1975